VfK Südwest Leipzig was a German association football club from the city of Leipzig, Saxony. The team was part of the Arbeiter-Turn- und Sportbund (ATSB or Workers' Gymnastics and Sports Federation) a national German sports organization active between 1893-1933. The ATSB actively promoted leftist political views built around class struggle and nationalism. The Nazi regime regarded worker's and faith-based clubs as politically undesirable and this led to the disbanding of the club in 1933. VfK made a single playoff appearance in 1931-32 and were eliminated 4:3 by FT Cottbus 93

References 

 Grüne, Hardy (2001). Vereinslexikon. Kassel: AGON Sportverlag 

Football clubs in Germany
Association football clubs established in 1892
1892 establishments in Germany